Florence Hooton (8 July 1912 – 14 May 1988) was an English cellist. She was born in Scarborough, the daughter of a cellist, and studied at the Royal Academy of Music under Douglas Cameron, then in Zurich with Emanuel Feuermann.

Her debut recital was in 1934 at the Wigmore Hall and her BBC Proms debut a year later, playing Beethoven's Triple Concerto. During the 1930s she was a member of the Grinke Trio (with violinist Frederick Grinke and pianist Dorothy Manley) and the New English String Quartet. She later formed the Loveridge-Martin-Hooton Trio with pianist Iris Loveridge and her husband, the violinist David Martin. It was active between 1956 and 1976.

Hooton became a professor at the Royal Academy of Music in 1964 and also gave private lessons in Suffolk and Sheffield. The Academy holds a portrait of her by Wilfrid Gabriel de Glehn, painted in 1936. It is hanging in the Duke's Hall.

Her premiere performances included: Gordon Jacob's Divertimento for Unaccompanied Cello (1934) which Jacob dedicated to her; Frank Bridge's Oration on 18 January 1936, after the work had been turned down by Felix Salmond and by Guilhermina Suggia; and William Busch's Cello Concerto on 13 August 1943 at the Proms. With Harriet Cohen she premiered Arnold Bax's Legend-Sonata in F sharp minor for cello and piano in 1943: the work is dedicated to her. Hooton also premiered Gordon Jacob's Cello Concerto at the Royal Albert Hall in 1955, Kenneth Leighton's Cello Concerto at the Cheltenham Festival in 1956, and Alan Bush's Concert Suite at the Royal Albert Hall the same year. In 1957 and 1958 she performed and broadcast the Cello Sonata in Eb by Helen Perkin with the composer at the piano.

Hooton recorded with Decca from the late 1930s and was a frequent broadcaster. Her last public performance was in 1978. In 1981 she commissioned Gordon Jacob to write a Cello Octet for her students at the Royal Academy. She was appointed OBE in 1982. Following her death the Academy established the annual David Martin/Florence Hooton Concerto Prize in her memory.

Hooton married David Martin in 1938. They lived in Ickenham in Middlesex at 34, Thornhill Road, and later at 345 Stag Lane, London NW9. There were two daughters. Martin died in 1982.

External links
 Notes to Lyrita CD REAM.2104, Florence Hooton Plays Bax & Jacob Cello Works
 Portrait of Florence Hooton by Wilfrid Gabriel de Glehn

References

1912 births
1988 deaths
British classical cellists
20th-century classical musicians
People from Scarborough, North Yorkshire
20th-century cellists